Harrow may refer to:

Places
 Harrow, Victoria, Australia
 Harrow, Ontario, Canada
 The Harrow, County Wexford, a village in Ireland
 London Borough of Harrow, England
 Harrow, London, a town in London
 Harrow (UK Parliament constituency)
 Harrow on the Hill
 Harrow, Caithness, a hamlet in Scotland

Schools
 Harrow School, independent school in Harrow, London, founded 1572
 Harrow College, college in Harrow, London, founded 1999
 Harrow High School, secondary school in Harrow, London
 Harrow International School Bangkok
 Harrow International School Beijing
 Harrow International School Hong Kong

Other uses
 Harrow (surname)
 Harrow (tool), an agricultural implement
 Harrow (TV series), an Australian television series
 The Harrow, a fantasy and horror magazine
 Harrow football, a football style played at Harrow School
 Harrow History Prize, a prize for children at British preparatory schools
 Harrow RFC, a rugby club
 Harrow Road, a road in London
 Battle of the Harrow, a battle of the Irish Rebellion of 1798
 Harrow, a playable character in Warframe
 Harrow, a size of cricket bat
 Harrow (novel), a 2021 novel by Joy Williams

See also
 Handley Page Harrow (disambiguation)
The Harrow & the Harvest, a 2011 album by Gillian Welch
 Harrow Green, Suffolk, England
 Harrow Weald, part of the London Borough
 North Harrow
 South Harrow
 West Harrow
 Harrow Hill, West Sussex, an archaeological site in England